Hydrurus is a genus of algae belonging to the family Hydruraceae.

The genus has almost cosmopolitan distribution.

Species:

Hydrurus foelidus 
Hydrurus foetidus 
Hydrurus penicillatus

References

Chrysophyceae
Heterokont genera
Algae genera